Mikhail Sergeyevich Bashilov (born 12 January 1993) is a Russian professional football player who plays for Armenian club Turan.

Career
He made his Russian Premier League debut for FC Tom Tomsk on 13 May 2012 in a game against FC Rostov.

References

External links
 
 
 

1993 births
Living people
Sportspeople from Tomsk
Russian footballers
Association football defenders
FC Tom Tomsk players
FC Tyumen players
FC Irtysh Omsk players
FK Utenis Utena players
FC Gorodeya players
FC Belshina Bobruisk players
FC Energetik-BGU Minsk players
Noravank SC players
FC Turan players
Russian Premier League players
Russian First League players
Russian Second League players
A Lyga players
Belarusian Premier League players
Armenian Premier League players
Russian expatriate footballers
Expatriate footballers in Lithuania
Expatriate footballers in Belarus
Expatriate footballers in Armenia
Expatriate footballers in Kazakhstan
Russian expatriate sportspeople in Lithuania
Russian expatriate sportspeople in Belarus
Russian expatriate sportspeople in Armenia
Russian expatriate sportspeople in Kazakhstan